Vincenzo Petrocelli (6 July 1823 – 2 February 1896) was a Neapolitan artist.
Petrocelli was born in Cervaro in the Kingdom of the Two Sicilies (now in Lazio). He studied under Domenico Morelli, and was active as a painter from about 1850. He was principally a history painter, but also painted portraits and genre scenes. His sons Achille and Arturo were both painters. Petrocelli died in Naples. Vincenzo Gemito made a terracotta bust of him in 1869.

Мuseum 
 Hermitage Museum, Saint Petersburg,.

References

19th-century Italian painters
Italian male painters
Italian genre painters
1825 births
1896 deaths
Romantic painters
Painters from Naples
19th-century Italian male artists